Terry Wilcox (born  1940) is an American professional golfer.

Wilcox grew up in Ada, Oklahoma. He played college golf at Oklahoma State University, graduating in 1962.

Wilcox turned professional in 1962. He played on the PGA Tour from 1964 to 1974 while also working as a club professional. His best finishes were a T-2 at the 1969 Azalea Open Invitational and a 2nd at the 1970 IVB-Philadelphia Golf Classic. His best finish in a major was a T-7 at the 1969 PGA Championship.

Wilcox served as tournament director of the Kraft Nabisco Championship, an LPGA major at the Mission Hills Country Club in Rancho Mirage, California, from 1994 to 2008.

Professional wins
this list may be incomplete
 1964 Westchester Open
 1965 Westchester Open
 1967 Metropolitan PGA Championship
 1974 North Carolina Open, Carolinas PGA Championship
 1976 North Carolina Open

Results in major championships

Note: Wilcox never played in The Open Championship.

CUT = missed the half-way cut
"T" = tied

References

External links
 

American male golfers
Oklahoma State Cowboys golfers
PGA Tour golfers
Golfers from Oklahoma
People from Ada, Oklahoma
People from Rancho Mirage, California
1940s births
Living people